Anthony Restwold (by 1517 – 1555/60) was an English politician. He was married to Alice Wilkes.

Career 
He was a Member (MP) of the Parliament of England for New Woodstock in November 1554 and for Aylesbury in 1555.

References

16th-century deaths
English MPs 1554–1555
English MPs 1555
Year of birth uncertain